VCTC Intercity (formerly known as Ventura Intercity Service Transit Authority or VISTA) is a public transit agency providing bus service in Ventura County, California. It provides an intercity bus service between the cities of Ventura, Oxnard, Camarillo, Thousand Oaks, Moorpark, Santa Paula, and Fillmore in Ventura County, and to communities in neighboring Los Angeles and Santa Barbara counties. The agency is part of the Ventura County Transportation Commission, a governmental body that oversees transportation planning and funding in Ventura County.

History 
Before VISTA was formed in 1994, the County of Ventura provided rudimentary intercity bus service. One line ran along US 101 with stops in Ventura, Oxnard, Camarillo, Thousand Oaks, and Westlake Village. Another service linked Thousand Oaks and Moorpark via SR 23. The city of Fillmore sponsored a route consisting of a few trips between Fillmore and Ventura along SR 126. Because of the limited nature of these services, the Ventura County Transportation Commission proposed a comprehensive intercity bus system.

VISTA began service on four core lines (Highway 101, East County, Highway 126, and a Central County route serving Camarillo, Camarillo State Mental Hospital, Point Mugu, and Oxnard) in July 1994. Over time, these routes have been adjusted according to ridership. With the closing of Camarillo State Hospital and the repurposing of the hospital grounds as California State University, Channel Islands, the Central route was cancelled and two new campus shuttle routes were implemented. In 1998, service was extended to Warner Center in Los Angeles County, and in 2001, service was extended to Santa Barbara.

In early 2015, VCTC changed the name of the service from VISTA to VCTC Intercity.

The VCTC Intercity bus service is operated by Roadrunner Shuttle, a subsidiary of RATP Dev USA, under contract. Due to the length of the VISTA routes, over-the-road coaches are used.

Routes

Highway 101 / Conejo 
Provides service along the length of US 101 in Ventura County, originating at the Pacific View Mall, and stopping at various places in Oxnard, Camarillo, and Thousand Oaks. Routes are numbered 50–52X.

Four round trips, two in the morning and two in the afternoon, connect Oxnard, Camarillo, and Thousand Oaks with the Warner Center Transit Hub and other stops at Warner Center, a business and residential complex in the western San Fernando Valley, in Los Angeles County. At the transit hub, riders may connect with a shuttle to the Metro G Line and other transit services from a variety of agencies, providing access to many points in Los Angeles County.

Highway 126 
This route also originates at the Pacific View Mall in Ventura and operates along SR 126 to Saticoy, Santa Paula, and Fillmore. Routes are numbered 60-62.

East County 
VISTA East County route operates in the SR 23 corridor between Westlake Village, Thousand Oaks, Moorpark, and Simi Valley. Routes are numbered 70–73X.

Coastal Express 
This route connects Ventura with Carpinteria and Santa Barbara. Peak hour trips also serve Goleta and UC Santa Barbara. Riders may connect with MTD services in Santa Barbara County. Routes are numbered 80–89. This VCTC service replaced a Clean Air Express line in 2001.

Channel Islands 
Originally two separate lines, this shuttle route connects CSU Channel Islands with the Camarillo Metrolink Station and the Oxnard "C" Street Transfer Center. Students are encouraged to park in the lots and use this service to get to campus. Routes are numbered 90–99.

Dial-a-ride services 
VISTA operates dial-a-ride service (on demand for those meeting certain requirements) in Santa Paula, Fillmore, and Piru.

See also 
Gold Coast Transit — Local bus service within and between Oxnard, Ventura, Port Hueneme, and Ojai, and adjacent unincorporated communities in Ventura County
Metrolink (California) — Commuter rail service connecting Ventura, Oxnard, Camarillo, Moorpark, and Simi Valley to Los Angeles County and other parts of Southern California
Oxnard–Thousand Oaks–Ventura metropolitan area

References

Sources 
Ventura County Interconnect schedule brochures: 1985–1991
Various VISTA schedule brochures: 1992–present

External links 

Public transportation in Ventura County, California
Bus transportation in California
Transit agencies in California
Transportation in Oxnard, California
Transportation in Simi Valley, California
Transportation in Thousand Oaks, California
Ventura, California
Camarillo, California
Fillmore, California
Moorpark, California
Santa Paula, California
Public transportation in the San Fernando Valley
Government agencies established in 1994
1994 establishments in California
RATP Group